Eddie Lawson (born March 11, 1958) is an American former four-time Grand Prix motorcycle racing World Champion. His record of not crashing and consistently finishing in the points earned him the nickname "Steady Eddie".

Biography
Born in Upland, California, Lawson began his motorcycle racing career in the Southern California dirt track circuit. When it became increasingly difficult to find machinery able to compete with the dominant Harley-Davidsons, he switched his attention to road racing. In 1979, Lawson finished the season second behind Freddie Spencer in the AMA 250cc road racing National Championship. Afterwards, he was offered a ride with the Kawasaki Superbike team and won the AMA Superbike Series in 1981 and 1982. He also won the AMA 250cc road racing National Championship in 1980 and 1981 for Kawasaki.

Lawson accepted an offer from Yamaha to contest the 500cc World Championship as Kenny Roberts' teammate for the 1983 season. Lawson spent the 1983 season learning the ropes of the Grand Prix circuit. In 1984, Lawson began winning regularly and won the 1984 World Championship. It would mark the first of four world titles Lawson would go on to win. In 1985, he won the prestigious Imola 200 pre-season race. After winning two more titles for Yamaha in 1986  and 1988, Lawson shocked the racing world by announcing he would be leaving Yamaha to sign with their arch-rivals Rothmans Honda as teammate to his own archrival, Australia's 1987 World Champion Wayne Gardner. By switching teams, Lawson also fulfilled his desire to work with Erv Kanemoto. After Gardner crashed and broke his leg during the third round at Laguna Seca, Lawson went on to win the 1989 title for Honda, becoming the first rider to win back-to-back championships on machines from different manufacturers before Valentino Rossi did so in 2004 (moved from Honda to Yamaha). Furthermore, he was the fourth satellite rider to win the premier class world title before Valentino Rossi did so in 2001, 12 years later.

Lawson then switched to Cagiva in 1991 and the following year he achieved his last victory (that was also the first win for Cagiva after 10 years of racing). 
In so doing, he joined a very restricted number of great riders who managed to win races in top class with three different manufacturers, the others being Mike Hailwood (British Norton, MV Agusta, Honda), Randy Mamola (Suzuki, Honda, Yamaha) and Loris Capirossi (Yamaha, Honda, Ducati) and definitively silenced the critics who believed he would not be as successful away from the factory Marlboro Yamaha team.

Lawson also won the ABC Superbikers event at Carlsbad Calif. in 1983 and 1985 which pitted the best riders from several disciplines against each other on a combined dirt and paved course. He was riding a specially equipped factory YZ 490 Yamaha.

In 1990, Lawson won the Suzuka 8 Hours endurance race on a Yamaha FZR750R paired with teammate Tadahiko Taira. Lawson also won the Daytona 200 in 1986 and came out of retirement to win it again in 1993. When he retired from Grand Prix racing in the early 1990s, he ranked third on the all-time MotoGP class (then known as 500GP) Grand Prix wins list with 31.

After finishing his motorcycle career, Lawson pursued a career in open-wheel single seater racing in the United States competing in the Indy Lights series and eventually to CART. In the 1996 IndyCar season, he competed in 11 races with his best results being two sixth-place finishes at U.S. 500 and the Detroit Indy Grand Prix. His passion for speed remains undiminished and the former World Champion now enjoys driving 250cc Superkarts often accompanied by his great friend and rival Wayne Rainey, who races in a specially modified Superkart to cope with his spinal injuries, and historic Formula One cars, with a Walter Wolf Racing WR4 at vintage events.

Honors
 Lawson was inducted into the Motorcycle Hall of Fame in 1999.
 He was inducted in the Motorsports Hall of Fame of America in 2002.
 Lawson was inducted into the FIM MotoGP Hall of Fame in 2005.

Racing career statistics
 
Points system from 1969 to 1987:

Points system from 1988 to 1992:

(key) (Races in bold indicate pole position; races in italics indicate fastest lap)

American open-wheel racing results
(key)

Indy Lights

CART

References

External links

Eddie Lawson at MotoGP Legends

American motorcycle racers
AMA Grand National Championship riders
American racing drivers
500cc World Championship riders
AMA Superbike Championship riders
Champ Car drivers
Indy Lights drivers
People from Upland, California
1958 births
Living people
Racing drivers from California
Tasman Motorsports drivers
500cc World Riders' Champions